Gary Cedric Beacock (born 22 January 1960) is an English former professional footballer who played as a midfielder.

References

1960 births
Living people
Sportspeople from Scunthorpe
English footballers
Association football midfielders
Sheffield United F.C. players
Grimsby Town F.C. players
Hereford United F.C. players
Cheltenham Town F.C. players
English Football League players